Antony Dupuis was the defending champion but did not participate.

Robin Söderling won the title defeating Radek Štěpánek 6–3, 6–7(2–7), 7–6(7–5) in the final.

Seeds
A champion seed is indicated in bold text while text in italics indicates the round in which that seed was eliminated.

  Andrei Pavel (second round)
  Ivan Ljubičić (semifinals)
  Mario Ančić (second round)
  Radek Štěpánek (final)
  Robin Söderling (champion)
  Rainer Schüttler (quarterfinals)
  Karol Beck (quarterfinals)
  Max Mirnyi (semifinals)

Draw

Finals

Top half

Bottom half

References

External links
 ITF tournament edition details
 Singles draw
 Qualifying Singles draw

Milan Indoor
2005 ATP Tour
Milan
2005 Milan Indoor